Robert Cleary (born May 15, 2003) is a Canadian soccer player who currently plays for Sigma FC in League1 Ontario.

Early life
Cleary began his career with the RVDL Lions, created by former Dutch player Robin van der Laan, later playing for the Burlington Bayhawks in OPDL and then moved to Sigma FC at age 14.

College career
In January 2021, Cleary committed to Oakland University. He played 10 games in 2021, recording 3 assists.

Club career
In June 2021, Cleary signed a developmental contract with Canadian Premier League club Forge FC. He made his professional debut on July 1 against FC Edmonton, subbing in for Chris Nanco in an eventual 2–0 defeat. As part of his developmental contract, he also played with Sigma FC in League1 Ontario.

In 2022, he played for Sigma FC in League1 Ontario, also playing for the Sigma FC U21 in the Reserve Division where he scored 6 goals in 10 games.

References

External links

2003 births
Living people
Association football forwards
Canadian soccer players
Soccer people from Ontario
Sportspeople from Burlington, Ontario
Forge FC players
League1 Ontario players
Canadian Premier League players
Sigma FC players
Burlington SC (League1 Ontario) players